Henry Austin Bruce, 1st Baron Aberdare  (16 April 1815 – 25 February 1895), was a British Liberal Party politician, who served in government most notably as Home Secretary (1868–1873) and as Lord President of the Council.

Background and education
Henry Bruce was born at Duffryn, Aberdare, Glamorganshire, the son of John Bruce, a Glamorganshire landowner, and his first wife Sarah, daughter of Reverend Hugh Williams Austin. John Bruce's original family name was Knight, but on coming of age in 1805 he assumed the name of Bruce: his mother, through whom he inherited the Duffryn estate, was the daughter of William Bruce, high sheriff of Glamorganshire.

Henry was educated from the age of twelve at the Bishop Gore School, Swansea (Swansea Grammar School). In 1837 he was called to the bar from Lincoln's Inn. Shortly after he had begun to practice, the discovery of coal beneath the Duffryn and other Aberdare Valley estates brought his family great wealth. From 1847 to 1854 Bruce was stipendiary magistrate for Merthyr Tydfil and Aberdare, resigning the position in the latter year, after entering parliament as Liberal member for Merthyr Tydfil.

Industrialist and politician, 1852–1868

Bruce was returned unopposed as MP for Merthyr Tydfil in December 1852, following the death of Sir John Guest. He did so with the enthusiastic support of the late member's political allies, notably the iron masters of Dowlais, and he was thereafter regarded by his political opponents, most notably in the Aberdare Valley, as their nominee. Even so, Bruce's parliamentary record demonstrated support for liberal policies, with the exception of the ballot. The electorate in the constituency at this time remained relatively small, excluding the vast majority of the working classes.

Significantly, however, Bruce's relationship with the miners of the Aberdare Valley, in particular, deteriorated as a result of the Aberdare Strike of 1857–58. In a speech to a large audience of miners at the Aberdare Market Hall, Bruce sought to strike a conciliatory tone in persuading the miners to return to work. In a second speech, however, he delivered a broadside against the trade union movement generally, referring to the violence engendered elsewhere as a result of strikes and to alleged examples of intimidation and violence in the immediate locality. The strike damaged his reputation and may well have contributed to his eventual election defeat ten years later. In 1855, Bruce was appointed a trustee of the Dowlais Iron Company and played a role in the further development of the iron industry.

In November 1862, after nearly ten years in Parliament, he became Under-Secretary of State for the Home Department, and held that office until April 1864. He became a Privy Councillor and a Charity Commissioner for England and Wales in 1864, when he was moved to be Vice-President of the Council of Education.

1868 general election
At the 1868 general election, Merthyr Tydfil became a two-member constituency with a much-increased electorate as a result of the Second Reform Act of 1867. Since the formation of the constituency, Merthyr Tydfil had dominated representation as the vast majority of the electorate lived in the town and its vicinity, whereas there was a much lower number of electors in the neighbouring Aberdare Valley. During the 1850s and 1860s, however, the population of Aberdare grew rapidly, and the franchise changes in 1867 gave the vote to large numbers of miners in that valley. Amongst these new electors, Bruce remained unpopular as a result of his actions during the 1857–58 dispute. Initially, it appeared that the Aberdare iron master, Richard Fothergill, would be elected to the second seat alongside Bruce. However, the appearance of a third Liberal candidate, Henry Richard, a nonconformist radical popular in both Merthyr and Aberdare, left Bruce on the defensive and he was ultimately defeated, finishing in third place behind both Richard and Fothergill.

Later political career

After losing his seat, Bruce was elected for Renfrewshire on 25 January 1869, and was made Home Secretary by William Ewart Gladstone.  His tenure of this office was conspicuous for a reform of the licensing laws, and he was responsible for the Licensing Act 1872, which made the magistrates the licensing authority, increased the penalties for misconduct in public-houses and shortened the number of hours for the sale of drink. In 1873 Bruce relinquished the home secretaryship, at Gladstone's request, to become Lord President of the Council, and was elevated to the peerage as Baron Aberdare, of Duffryn in the County of Glamorgan, on 23 August that year. Being a Gladstonian Liberal, Aberdare had hoped for a much more radical proposal to keep existing licensee holders for a further ten years, and to prevent any new applicants. Its unpopularity pricked his nonconformist's conscience, when like Gladstone himself he had a strong leaning towards Temperance. He had already pursued 'moral improvement' on miners in the regulations attempting to further ban boys from the pits. The Trades Union Act 1871 was another more liberal regime giving further rights to unions, and protection from malicious prosecutions.

The defeat of the Liberal government in the following year terminated Lord Aberdare's official political life, and he subsequently devoted himself to social, educational and economic questions. Education became one of Lord Aberdare's main interests in later life. His interest had been shown by the speech on Welsh education which he had made on 5 May 1862. In 1880, he was appointed to chair the Departmental Committee on Intermediate and Higher Education in Wales and Monmouthshire, whose report ultimately led to the Welsh Intermediate Education Act of 1889. The report also stimulated the campaign for the provision of university education in Wales. In 1883, Lord Aberdare was elected the first president of the University College of South Wales and Monmouthshire. In his inaugural address he declared that the framework of Welsh education would not be complete until there was a University of Wales. The University was eventually founded in 1893 and Aberdare became its first chancellor.

In 1876 he was elected a Fellow of the Royal Society; from 1878 to 1891 he was president of the Royal Historical Society. and in 1881 he became president of both the Royal Geographical Society and the Girls' Day School Trust. In 1888 he headed the commission that established the Official Table of Drops, listing how far a person of a particular weight should be dropped when hanged for a capital offence (the only method of 'judicial execution' in the United Kingdom at that time), to ensure an instant and painless death, by cleanly breaking the neck between the 2nd and 3rd vertebrae, an 'exacting science', eventually brought to perfection by Chief Executioner Albert Pierrepoint. Prisoners health, clothing and discipline was a particular concern even at the end of his career. In the Lords he spoke at some length to the Home Affairs Committee chaired by Arthur Balfour about the prison rules system. Aberdare had always expressed concern about intemperate working-classes; in 1878 urging greater vigilance against the vice of excessive drinking, he took evidence on miners and railway colliers drinking habits. The committee tried to establish special legislation based on a link between Sunday Opening and absenteeism established in 1868. Aberdare had been interested in the plight of working class drinkers since Gladstone had appointed him Home Secretary. The defeat of the Licensing Bill by the Tory 'beerage' and publicans was drafted to limit hours and protect the public, but it persuaded a convinced Anglican forever more of the iniquities.

In 1882 he began a connection with West Africa which lasted the rest of his life, by accepting the chairmanship of the National African Company, formed by Sir George Goldie, which in 1886 received a charter under the title of the Royal Niger Company and in 1899 was taken over by the British government, its territories being constituted the protectorate of Nigeria. West African affairs, however, by no means exhausted Lord Aberdare's energies, and it was principally through his efforts that a charter was in 1894 obtained for the University College of South Wales and Monmouthshire,a constituent institution of the University of Wales. This is now Cardiff University. Lord Aberdare, who in 1885 was made a Knight Grand Cross of the Order of the Bath, presided over several Royal Commissions at different times.

Family

Henry Bruce married firstly Annabella, daughter of Richard Beadon, of Clifton by Annabella A'Court, sister of 1st Baron Heytesbury, on 6 January 1846. They had one son and three daughters. 
 Henry Campbell Bruce, 2nd Baron
 Margaret Cecilia married on 16 September 1889, Douglas Close Richmond, CB, MA, son of Rev. Henry Sylvester Richmond MA, rector of Wyck Rissington, Glos.
 Rachel Mary married 10 September 1872, Augustus George Vernon-Harcourt of St Clare, Ryde, Isle of Wight, son of Admiral Frederick Edward Vernon-Harcourt.
 Jessie Frances, married 3 September 1878, Rev John William Wynne-Jones, MA, rector of Llantrisant, Anglesey. son of John Wynne-Jones JP, DL, of Treiorworth, Bodedern, Holyhead, Anglesey.

After her death on 28 July 1852 he married secondly on 17 August 1854 Norah Creina Blanche, youngest daughter of Lt-Gen Sir William Napier, KCB the historian of the Peninsular War, whose biography he edited, by Caroline Amelia, second daughter of Gen. Henry Edward Fox, son of the Earl of Ilchester. They had seven daughters and two sons, of whom:
 the youngest was the mountaineer Charles Granville Bruce. 
 Alice Bruce took on her mother's ideas and took a leading role in women's education.
 Sarah married Montague Muir Mackenzie, barrister.
 Elizabeth Fox Bruce (1861–1935) married the author Percy Ewing Matheson.

Lord Aberdare died at his London home, 39 Princes Gardens, South Kensington, on 25 February 1895, aged 79, and was succeeded in the barony by his only son by his first marriage, Henry. He was survived by his wife, Lady Aberdare, born 1827, who died on 27 April 1897. She was a proponent of women's education and active in the establishment of Aberdare Hall in Cardiff.

Memorial
Henry Austin Bruce is buried at Aberffrwd Cemetery in Mountain Ash, Wales. His large family plot is surrounded by a chain, and his gravestone is a simple Celtic cross with double plinth and kerb. In place is written "To God the Judge of all and to the spirits of just men more perfect."

References

Bibliography

External links
 
 
 
 

Aberdare, Henry Austin Bruce, 1st Baron
Aberdare, Henry Austin Bruce, 1st Baron
Bruce, Henry Austin
Bruce, Henry Austin
Bruce, Henry Austin
Bruce, Henry Austin
Bruce, Henry Austin
Bruce, Henry Austin
Bruce, Henry Austin
Bruce, Henry Austin
UK MPs who were granted peerages
Fellows of the Royal Society
Deputy Lieutenants of Glamorgan
Aberdare, Henry Austin Bruce, 1st Baron
Aberdare, Henry Austin Bruce, 1st Baron
Aberdare, Henry Austin Bruce, 1st Baron
Aberdare, Henry Austin Bruce, 1st Baron
Aberdare, Henry Austin Bruce, 1st Baron
Aberdare, Henry Austin Bruce, 1st Baron
Aberdare, Henry Austin Bruce, 1st Baron
Aberdare, Henry Austin Bruce, 1st Baron (1881–1895)
Aberdare, Henry Austin Bruce, 1st Baron
People educated at Bishop Gore School
Peers of the United Kingdom created by Queen Victoria
Henry 1
Church Estates Commissioners